is the first full studio album by Fujifabric, released in 2004 on the Capitol Records label.

Track listing 
 
Taifu
 
 
 
 "Tokyo Midnight"

Chart positions

Fujifabric albums
2004 debut albums